Max Pfister (21 April 1932 in Zürich – 21 October 2017 in Saarbrücken) was a Swiss Romance studies scholar and linguist.

He is the initiator of the LEI (Lessico etimologico italiano), which deals with Italian and German research of etymology and dialectology of the Italian language, now directed together with Wolfgang Schweickard .

Selected publications
Pfister, Max: Lessico etimologico italiano, Wiesbaden, Reichert, 1979ff.

Honors
Mainzer Akademie der Wissenschaften, Socio corrispondente straniero der Accademia della Crusca
Premio Galileo Galilei dei Rotary Italiani
Diploma di 1 Classe con Medaglia d'Oro ai Benemeriti della Cultura e dell'Arte, conferred by the Italian president Carlo Azeglio Ciampi, 2006

References

External links
 
Max Pfister
- Lessico Etimologico Italiano

1932 births
2017 deaths
People from Zürich
Linguists from Germany
Grammarians of Italian
Academic staff of Saarland University
Romance philologists